The 2017 AFC Champions League knockout stage was played from 22 May to 25 November 2017. A total of 16 teams competed in the knockout stage to decide the champions of the 2017 AFC Champions League.

Qualified teams
The winners and runners-up of each of the eight groups in the group stage advanced to the round of 16, with both West Region (Groups A–D) and East Region (Groups E–H) having eight qualified teams.

Format

In the knockout stage, the 16 teams played a single-elimination tournament, with the teams split into the two regions until the final. Each tie was played on a home-and-away two-legged basis. The away goals rule, extra time (away goals would not apply in extra time) and penalty shoot-out were used to decide the winner if necessary (Regulations Article 11.3).

Schedule
The schedule of each round was as follows. Matches in the West Region were played on Mondays and Tuesdays, while matches in the East Region were played on Tuesdays and Wednesdays.

Bracket
The bracket of the knockout stage was determined as follows:

The bracket was decided after the draw for the knockout stage, which was held on 6 June 2017, 16:00 MYT (UTC+8), at the JW Marriott Hotel Kuala Lumpur in Kuala Lumpur, Malaysia.

Round of 16

In the round of 16, the winners of one group played the runners-up of another group from the same region, with the matchups determined by the group stage draw, and the group winners hosting the second leg.

|-
|+West Region

|+East Region

West Region

Al-Ain won 6–2 on aggregate.

Al-Ahli (KSA) won 4–2 on aggregate.

Al-Hilal won 4–2 on aggregate.

Persepolis won 1–0 on aggregate.

East Region

Kawasaki Frontale won 7–2 on aggregate.

2–2 on aggregate. Guangzhou Evergrande won on away goals.

Shanghai SIPG won 5–3 on aggregate.

Urawa Red Diamonds won 3–2 on aggregate.

Quarter-finals

The draw for the quarter-finals was held on 6 June 2017. In the quarter-finals, the four teams from the West Region played in two ties, and the four teams from the East Region played in two ties, with the matchups and order of legs decided by draw, without any seeding or country protection.

|-
|+West Region

|+East Region

|}

West Region

Al Hilal won 3–0 on aggregate.

Persepolis won 5–3 on aggregate.

East Region

5–5 on aggregate. Shanghai SIPG won 5–4 on penalties.

Urawa Red Diamonds won 5–4 on aggregate.

Semi-finals

In the semi-finals, the two quarter-final winners from the West Region played each other, and the two quarter-final winners from the East Region played each other, with the order of legs determined by the quarter-final draw.

|-
|+West Region

|+East Region

|}

West Region

Al Hilal won 6–2 on aggregate.

East Region

Urawa Red Diamonds won 2–1 on aggregate.

Final

In the final, the two semi-final winners played each other, with the order of legs (first leg hosted by team from the West Region, second leg hosted by team from the East Region) reversed from the previous season's final.

Urawa Red Diamonds won 2–1 on aggregate.

Note

References

External links
, the-AFC.com
AFC Champions League 2017, stats.the-AFC.com

3
May 2017 sports events in Asia
August 2017 sports events in Asia
September 2017 sports events in Asia
October 2017 sports events in Asia
November 2017 sports events in Asia